Tang-e Tur (also Romanized as Tang-e Ţūr, Tang-e Tūr, and Tang-i-Tūr) is a village in Banesh Rural District, Beyza District, Sepidan County, Fars Province, Iran. At the 2006 census, its population was 452, in 100 families.

References 

Populated places in Beyza County